is a Japanese speed skater. He has an Olympic gold medal from 1998 in the 500 m, and held the 500 m record (34.32).

He married Japanese fashion model Reiko Takagaki.

World records 

Source: SpeedSkatingStats.com

References 

 Hiroyasu Shimizu at SpeedSkatingStats.com
 
 Photos of Hiroyasu Shimizu

External links
 
 
 

1974 births
Living people
Japanese male speed skaters
Olympic speed skaters of Japan
Olympic gold medalists for Japan
Olympic silver medalists for Japan
Olympic bronze medalists for Japan
Olympic medalists in speed skating
Speed skaters at the 1994 Winter Olympics
Speed skaters at the 1998 Winter Olympics
Speed skaters at the 2002 Winter Olympics
Speed skaters at the 2006 Winter Olympics
Medalists at the 1998 Winter Olympics
Medalists at the 2002 Winter Olympics
Asian Games gold medalists for Japan
Asian Games silver medalists for Japan
Asian Games medalists in speed skating
Speed skaters at the 2003 Asian Winter Games
Speed skaters at the 2007 Asian Winter Games
Medalists at the 2003 Asian Winter Games
World record setters in speed skating
Nihon University alumni
Sportspeople from Hokkaido
People from Obihiro, Hokkaido
World Single Distances Speed Skating Championships medalists
World Sprint Speed Skating Championships medalists